Abbasabad (also Romanized as ‘Abbāsābād and ‘Abbāsēbād; also known as Qaleh Abbāsābād) is a village in Doreh Rural District, in the Central District of Sarbisheh County, South Khorasan Province, Iran. At the 2006 census, its population was 66, in 20 families.

References 

Populated places in Sarbisheh County